Neodolodus is a genus of extinct litoptern from the late middle Miocene of southern Colombia. It was named in 1986 by Hoffstetter and Soria, for the species Neodolodus colombianus from the Castilletes Formation and the La Victoria and Villavieja Formations of the Honda Group. The type species N. colombianus is known from a right mandibular ramus, teeth, and part of the fore- and hindlimbs. Neodolodus has been classified as a species of Prothoatherium or Lambdaconus, but was recognized as a distinct genus by McGrath and colleagues in 2020. The taxon was recovered in a phylogenetic analysis as the sister taxon of Protheosodon, between other proterotheriid genera like Picturotherium and Anisolophus.

References

Proterotheriids
Miocene mammals of South America
Neogene Colombia
Fossils of Colombia
Laventan
Honda Group, Colombia
Prehistoric placental genera
Fossil taxa described in 1986